Hognaston is a civil parish in the Derbyshire Dales district of Derbyshire, England.  The parish contains nine listed buildings that are recorded in the National Heritage List for England.  Of these, one listed at Grade II*, the middle of the three grades, and the others are at Grade II, the lowest grade.  The parish contains the village of Hognaston and the surrounding area.  The listed buildings consist of houses, cottages, farmhouses, a church, and a telephone kiosk.


Key

Buildings

References

Citations

Sources

 

Lists of listed buildings in Derbyshire